Chen Gang (born 15 February 1968) is a Chinese retired para table tennis player. He won two gold medals at the 2008 Summer Paralympics.

Chen lost his left leg in a 2001 car accident. He played table tennis as a youngster, and was briefly a teammate of the eventual Olympic champion Chen Jing.

References

1968 births
Living people
Table tennis players at the 2008 Summer Paralympics
Paralympic medalists in table tennis
Medalists at the 2008 Summer Paralympics
Chinese male table tennis players
Paralympic gold medalists for China
Paralympic table tennis players of China
Table tennis players from Wuhan
Chinese amputees
FESPIC Games competitors
21st-century Chinese people